The electricity sector in Sweden has three operational nuclear power plants with 6 operational nuclear reactors, which produce about 29.8% of the country's electricity. The nation's largest power station, Forsmark Nuclear Power Plant, has three reactors producing 3.3 GW and 14% of Sweden's electricity.

Sweden formerly had a nuclear phase-out policy, aiming to end nuclear power generation in Sweden by 2010. On 5 February 2009, the Government of Sweden announced an agreement allowing for the replacement of existing reactors, effectively ending the phase-out policy.

History

Early history
Sweden began research into nuclear energy in 1947 with the establishment of the Atomic Energy Company, AB Atomenergi, which originated in the ongoing military research and development at the Defence Institute FOA. 
In 1954, the country built its first small research heavy water reactor, the R1 nuclear reactor. The R1 was dismantled in 1970.
It was followed by two heavy water reactors: Ågesta or R3 nuclear reactor, a small heat and power reactor in 1964, and Marviken or R4 nuclear reactor which was finished but never operated (was never loaded with nuclear fuel), due to several safety issues. The R3 reactor stopped operations in 1974 and is to be demolished with work beginning in 2020 and ending 2025. The R4 project was cancelled in 1970, with the site being used in non-nuclear capacity since.
Also a reactor named the R2 nuclear reactor, the second nuclear reactor in Sweden, was built in Studsvik, east of Nyköping. Studsvik also hosted a reactor named R2-0 nuclear reactor. Both R2 and R2-0 were small research reactors, and both were decommissioned in 2005. Furthermore there was also a third research reactor in Studsvik	called FR-0 nuclear reactor which was a zero-power fast reactor with low power output. It was operated 1964–1971 and was then dismantled.

On 1 May 1969, the prototype nuclear cogeneration plant Ågestaverket (R3) suffered an incident in which secondary cooling water flooded through a broken valve and caused a number of electrical problems in the plant, resulting in a 4-day shutdown.

R1, R3, and particularly the never finished R4 project at Marviken were heavy water reactors, motivated by the option to use Swedish uranium without isotope enrichment and by the possibility to use the reactors to produce weapons grade plutonium for Swedish nuclear warheads. The Swedish nuclear weapons program was eventually shut down, however, and Sweden signed the nuclear non-proliferation treaty in 1968.

Six nuclear reactors began commercial service in the 1970s, and another six through 1985. Nine of the reactors were designed by Allmänna Svenska Elektriska Aktiebolaget (ASEA), and three supplied by Westinghouse.

Plans for nuclear phase-out
After the Three Mile Island accident in 1979, there was a national referendum in Sweden about the future of nuclear power. As a result of this, the Riksdag decided in 1980 that no further nuclear power plants should be built, and that a nuclear power phase-out should be completed by 2010. Some observers have condemned the referendum as flawed because people could only vote "NO to nuclear", although three options were basically a harder or a softer "NO".

After the 1986 Chernobyl accident in USSR, the question of security of nuclear energy was again raised. 
In July 1992 an incident at Barsebäck 2 showed that the five older boiling water reactors had had potentially reduced capacity in their emergency core cooling systems since they started operation. Mineral wool was dislodged and ended up in the suppression pool where it clogged the suction strainers. It was classified as a grade 2 incident in the IAEA INES scale, due to the degradation of defence-in-depth. All five reactors were ordered down by the Nuclear Inspectorate for remedial action where backwash and additional strainers were installed. Most of the reactors were back in operation by next Spring, but Oskarshamn 1 remained down until January 1996 due to other work being carried out.

During the late 1990s a unique capacity tax on nuclear power (effektskatten) was introduced. It was initially set at 5514 SEK per MWth per month, and only applied to nuclear power plants, thus penalizing them relative to other energy sources. In January 2006 it was almost doubled (at 10,200 SEK per MWth per month). An agreement struck in June 2016 among other things meant the capacity tax would be phased out by 2019. By then the tax constituted about one third of the cost of operating a nuclear reactor.

In 1997 the Riksdag decided to shut down one of the reactors at Barsebäck by 1 July 1998 and the second before 1 July 2001, although under the condition that their energy production would be compensated. 
The next conservative government tried to cancel the phase-out, but, after protests, decided instead to extend the time limit to 2010. At Barsebäck, block 1 was shut down on 30 November 1999 and block 2 on 1 June 2005.

In August 2006 three of Sweden's ten nuclear reactors were shut down due to safety concerns following an incident at Forsmark Nuclear Power Plant, in which two out of four emergency power generators failed causing a power shortage. It was classified as a grade 2 incident in the INES scale, due to the degradation of defence-in-depth.

In 2006 the Centre Party of Sweden, an opposition party that until then had supported the phase-out, announced that it was dropping its opposition to nuclear power, at least for the time being, claiming that it is unrealistic to expect the phase-out in the short term. It said it would now support the stance of the other opposition parties in Alliance for Sweden, which were considerably more pro-nuclear than the then Social Democratic government.

Phase-out abandoned
On 17 June 2010, the Riksdag adopted a decision allowing the replacement of the existing reactors with new nuclear reactors, starting from 1 January 2011.

In June 2016, the coalition government decided to abolish the nuclear power output tax in 2019 and to successively replace the existing reactors with new ones. In October 2022, the new Swedish governing decided to have Ringhals 1 and 2 reactors restarted and the construction of further reactors examined.

List of electricity producing nuclear reactors

Decommissioned reactors
The decommissioned nuclear reactors of Sweden are:
 R1 reactor, dismantled in 1970
 R2 reactor, decommissioned in 2005
 R2-0 reactor, decommissioned in 2005
 FR-0 reactor, dismantled after 1971
 R3 reactor at Ågesta Nuclear Plant, decommissioned 1974, demolition planned 2020-2025
 R4 nuclear reactor, cancelled in 1970
 Barsebäck Nuclear Power Plant Reactor 1, decommissioned 1999, demolition planned 2020-2028
 Barsebäck Nuclear Power Plant Reactor 2, decommissioned 2005, demolition planned 2020-2028
 Oskarshamn Nuclear Power Plant Unit 1, decommissioned 2017, demolition planned 2020-2028
 Oskarshamn Nuclear Power Plant Unit 2, decommissioned 2016, demolition planned 2020-2028
 Ringhals Nuclear Power Plant R1, decommissioned 2020
 Ringhals Nuclear Power Plant R2, decommissioned 2019

Public opinion
The nuclear energy phase-out is controversial in Sweden. The energy production of the remaining nuclear power plants has been considerably increased in recent years to compensate for the Barsebäck shut-down.

In May 2005, a poll of residents living around Barsebäck found that 94% wanted it to stay. The subsequent leak of radioactive water from the nuclear waste store in Forsmark did not lead to a major change in public opinion. According to a poll of January 2008, 48% of Swedes were in favour of building new nuclear reactors, 39% were opposed and 13% were undecided. However, the 2011 Fukushima Daiichi nuclear disaster in Japan reversed prior support of nuclear power, with polls showing that 64% of Swedes opposed new reactors while 27% supported them. However, in a poll November 2019 the public opinion has changed with 78% in favor of nuclear power and only 11% against.

Prior public support for nuclear power stood in contrast to the stances of the major political parties in Sweden, but after the polls in late 2019 the debate changed and the parties that want to build new nuclear power in Sweden (SD, M, KD, L ) put forth a demand to the leading government party, the Social Democrats to choose a path forward, otherwise they might break with the standing energy agreement and work to reform the policy towards nuclear power, outside of the influence of the minority government.

Nuclear waste 
Sweden has a well-developed nuclear waste management policy. Low-level waste is currently stored at the reactor sites or destroyed at Studsvik. The country has dedicated a ship, M/S Sigyn, to move waste from power plants to repositories.  Sweden has also constructed a permanent underground repository, SFR, final repository for short-lived radioactive waste, with a capacity of 63,000 cubic meters for intermediate and low-level waste. A central interim storage facility for spent nuclear fuel, Clab, is located near Oskarshamn. The government has also identified two potential candidates for burial of additional waste (high-level), Oskarshamn and Östhammar.

Anti-nuclear activists

In June 2010, Greenpeace anti-nuclear activists invaded Forsmark nuclear power plant to protest the then-plan to remove the government prohibition on building new nuclear power plants.  In October 2012, 20 Greenpeace activists scaled the outer perimeter fence of the Ringhals nuclear plant, and there was also an incursion of 50 activists at the Forsmark plant. Greenpeace said that its non-violent actions were protests against the continuing operation of these reactors, which it says are unsafe in European stress tests, and to emphasise that stress tests did nothing to prepare against threats from outside the plant. A report by the Swedish nuclear regulator said that "the current overall level of protection against sabotage is insufficient". Although Swedish nuclear power plants have security guards, the police are responsible for emergency response. The report criticised the level of cooperation between nuclear site staff and police in the case of sabotage or attack.

Photo gallery

See also 
 Politics of Sweden
 Nuclear energy policy
 Energy policy of the European Union

References

Further reading 
 William D. Nordhaus, The Swedish Nuclear Dilemma — Energy and the Environment, 1997 Hardcover, .
 Arne Kaijser / Jan-Henrik Meyer, “The World's Worst Located Nuclear Power Plant”: Danish and Swedish perspectives on the Swedish nuclear power plant Barsebäck. Journal for the History of Environment and Society 3 (2018): 71-105. Full Text
 Arne Kaijser, Sweden. Short Country Report (History of Nuclear Energy and Society Project) Update 2018. http://www.honest2020.eu/sites/default/files/deliverables_24/SW.pdf.

External links 
 
News
 3 August 2006, BBC: Swedes shut down some nuclear reactors following testing failures